"Homemade" is a song recorded by American country music singer Jake Owen. It was released in June 2019 as the third single from his sixth studio album, Greetings from... Jake.

Content
Written by Bobby Pinson, Drew Parker, Jared Mullins, Ben Goldsmith, and produced by Joey Moi, "Homemade" is described as a celebration of growing up in small town America.

Commercial performance
"Homemade" topped Billboards Country Airplay in March 2020. It has sold 32,000 copies in the United States as of March 2020.

Music video
The music video for "Homemade" premiered on September 27, 2019, and tells the love story of Jake Owen's own grandparents. Owen described their relationship as the classic American love story: "When I think about the love that people have had together, and I think about their story, there are plenty of songs that could be written about the love they share together." The video, which was shot in Lynnville, Tennessee and directed by Justin Clough, is set in the 1940s and shows Owen portraying his grandfather's younger self.

Charts

Weekly charts

Year-end charts

Certifications

References

2019 songs
2019 singles
Jake Owen songs
Big Loud singles
Songs written by Bobby Pinson
Song recordings produced by Joey Moi